Robert B. Spear (July 8, 1918 – October 26, 1995) was an American basketball coach.  He served as the head basketball coach at United States Air Force Academy from the inception of the Air Force Falcons men's basketball program in 1956 until 1971.  He was a graduate of DePauw University.

Head coaching record

References 

1918 births
1995 deaths
Air Force Falcons men's basketball coaches
American men's basketball coaches
American men's basketball players
Basketball coaches from Ohio
Basketball players from Ohio
College men's basketball head coaches in the United States
DePauw University alumni
Navy Midshipmen men's basketball coaches
Sportspeople from Mansfield, Ohio